Convoy PQ 15 was an Arctic convoy sent from Iceland by the Western Allies to aid the Soviet Union during the Second World War. The convoy sailed in late April 1942, reaching the Soviet northern ports after air attacks that sank three ships out of twenty-five.

Ships
The convoy consisted of 25 merchant ships and was accompanied by one auxiliary, the oiler , which travelled with a destroyer escort.

The Close Escort was led by Commander John Crombie in the minesweeper  and consisted of two other minesweepers and four trawlers, joined later by four destroyers and the anti-aircraft ship .

The convoy was also covered by a patrol of four submarines off Norway, guarding against a sortie by German warships.

Action
PQ 15 sailed from Reykjavík, Iceland, on 26 April 1942 with its local escort. This was joined on 28 April by the ocean escort, giving the convoy an immediate total escort of 12 warships.

German aircraft sighted the convoy on 28 April while it was south-west of Bear Island. No attack developed for two days as the German forces were busy with the reciprocal Convoy QP 11, which left Murmansk in the Soviet Union on 28 April.

On 1 May the Luftwaffe made its first attack on PQ 15, by six Junkers Ju 88s. The German bombers failed to inflict any damage and lost one of their number. The Distant Cover Force suffered two losses when King George V and the destroyer  collided in fog. Punjabi sank and King George V was forced to return to port. Her place in the group was taken by the battleship , which steamed from Scapa Flow to reinforce the escorts.

The escorts made an asdic contact on 2 May, which the destroyer  and minesweeper  attacked. When the submarine was damaged and forced to the surface it was found to be the Polish Jastrzab, which was assigned to patrol off Norway but was some way out of position. Jastrzab was too badly damaged to continue and was scuttled.

On 3 May at 01:30 in the half light of the Arctic summer nights, six Heinkel He 111 bombers of I. Gruppe, Kampfgeschwader 26, the Luftwaffes new torpedo bomber force, made the first German torpedo bomber attack of the war. Two aircraft were shot down and a third damaged, which subsequently crashed. A further attack by German high-level bombers at dusk was unsuccessful.

Deteriorating weather on 4 May prevented further attacks, an Arctic gale quickly turning into a snowstorm. PQ 15 arrived at the Kola Inlet at 21:00 on 5 May with no further losses.

Aftermath
Botavon and Cape Corso had been sunk by torpedo bombers; Jutland was damaged by torpedo bombers and later sunk by U-251. Of the escorting warships, the submarine Jastrzab and destroyer Punjabi had been sunk and the battleship King George V had been damaged. However, 22 fully laden merchant ships had arrived safely in Murmansk, the largest Allied convoy yet to arrive in the Soviet Union. The convoy was regarded by the Allies as a success, although it gave them a taste of the difficulties to come on the Arctic convoy run.

Ships in the convoy
The following information is from the Arnold Hague Convoy Database.

Merchant ships

Escort forces
The following information is from the Arnold Hague Convoy Database.

See also
 List of shipwrecks in May 1942

Footnotes

References

Further reading

External links
 Convoy PQ 15
  PQ 15 at Convoyweb

PQ 15
C